Kayle Short (born May 16, 1973, in Barrie, Ontario) is a Canadian retired professional ice hockey defenceman. Short played professionally in the North American minor leagues and in Europe.

Short played junior hockey with the Dukes of Hamilton, Sudbury Wolves and Guelph Storm. Short attended the University of New Brunswick and played for the Canadian National Team. He was with the Portland Pirates of the American Hockey League (AHL) and Hampton Roads Admirals of the ECHL from 1996 to 1998, the Sheffield Steelers and the Manchester Storm of the Ice Hockey Superleague from 1998 to 2002, the Fresno Falcons of the West Coast Hockey League in 2002–03, and the Las Vegas Wranglers and Peoria Rivermen of the ECHL in 2003–04.

Career statistics

References

1973 births
Canadian ice hockey defencemen
Fresno Falcons players
Guelph Storm players
Hamilton Dukes players
Hampton Roads Admirals players
Las Vegas Wranglers players
Living people
Manchester Storm (1995–2002) players
Peoria Rivermen (ECHL) players
Portland Pirates players
Sheffield Steelers players
Sudbury Wolves players
University of New Brunswick alumni
Ice hockey people from Ontario
Sportspeople from Barrie
Canadian expatriate ice hockey players in England